Keng Tawng (also spelled  Kyaingtaung) is a river town in Mong Nai Township in the Shan State of Burma. The area of the town is watered by the Nam Teng River.

History

Prior to the end of World War II, Kengtawng state was one of the substates of Mongnai State, in the Southern Shan States.

Keng Tawng was the town of Khun Sam Law, the hero of an ancient legend of the Shan people. It was also the birthplace of notorious usurper and warmonger Twet Nga Lu.

There is a hydroelectric project in the area of the town. Places like the iconic Kengtawng Falls are threatened by the project.

References

Populated places in Shan State